Giuseppe Farinella (24 December 1925 – 5 September 2017) was a Sicilian mafioso, boss of the San Mauro Castelverde family and a one-time member of the Sicilian Mafia Commission.

San Mauro Castelverde, a village on 1,000 meters above sea level in the Madonie mountain range in the province of Palermo, is the stronghold of the Farinella Mafia family that goes back to the 19th century. It is often used as a hide out for fugitive mafiosi. Giuseppe Farinella is the son of Mariano Farinella, already known as a criminal in the days of the Iron Prefect, Cesare Mori, appointed by Benito Mussolini to suppress the Mafia in the late 1920s.

For many years Giuseppe Don Peppino Farinella was the uncontested chieftain of the area. He became the "capo mandamento" of Gangi-San Mauro Castelverde area, and his influence reached into the province of Messina. He was a member of the Sicilian Mafia Commission since the late 1970s, according to the pentiti Salvatore Cancemi, Francesco Di Carlo and Giovanni Brusca. He was close to the Corleonesi, and supported them during the Second Mafia War, though due to San Mauro Castelverde's relative isolation, his Mafia faction did not have an active role in the war.

An old fashioned mafia boss, Don Peppino, did not allow his men to extort local shopkeepers, which was common among mafiosi from the countryside. Revenues were not considered worthwhile compared to the money that could be extorted from companies that won public tenders in construction. Moreover, not extorting local shopkeepers Mafia bosses increased their legitimacy among the locals. "Don Peppino did not want his men to extort a pizzo from the shopkeepers, according to a victim, because the latter, in contrast to entrepreneurs, did not carry out any speculative activity and the because he … thought that asking shopkeepers for a tangente seemed like begging for alms."

Farinella was arrested on March 21, 1992. As member of the Commission he was held responsible for the killing of the two prominent anti-mafia judges Paolo Borsellino and Giovanni Falcone, receiving life sentences. In January 1993, he was also sentenced to nine years in prison in the trial against the Mafia in Madonie area. He was considered to be the Mafia boss of the area.

He died on 5 September 2017 in prison in Parma.

References

Paoli, Letizia (2003). Mafia Brotherhoods: Organized Crime, Italian Style, New York: Oxford University Press 

1925 births
2017 deaths
Sicilian mafiosi
Sicilian Mafia Commission
Sicilian mafiosi sentenced to life imprisonment